This is a list of ambassadors of Canada to the United States, formally titled as Ambassador Extraordinary and Plenipotentiary to the United States of America for His [Her] Majesty's Government in Canada. Originally, Canada's top diplomatic representative to the U.S. had the rank of Envoy Extraordinary and Minister Plenipotentiary. The title was promoted to the rank of Ambassador Extraordinary and Plenipotentiary in 1943, during the period when Leighton McCarthy had the post.

Before November 25, 1926, Canada was represented in Washington D.C. by the British ambassador to the United States. 

Most Canadian ambassadors to the United States have been political appointees to the position. A few (Chrétien, Pearson, Charles Ritchie, Edgar Ritchie, Kirsten Hillman, and Wrong) were career diplomats or spent most of their career at the Department of External Affairs (or its successors).

Envoy Extraordinary and Minister Plenipotentiary

Ambassador Extraordinary and Plenipotentiary

See also
 Embassy of Canada, Washington, D.C.
 List of ambassadors of the United States to Canada

References
 

 

United States, List of Canadian ambassadors to the
Canadian ambassadors to the